This is a list of notable footballers who have played for Peterborough United. The aim is for this list to include all players that have played 100 or more senior matches for the club. Other players who are deemed to have played an important role for the club can also be included, but the reason for their assumed notability should be indicated in the 'Notes' column.

For a list of all Peterborough United players with a Wikipedia article, see :Category:Peterborough United F.C. players, and for the current squad see Peterborough United F.C.#Current squad.

Explanation of List

Players should be listed in chronological order according to the year in which they first played for the club, and then by alphabetical order of their surname. Appearances and goals should include substitute appearances, but exclude wartime matches. Further information on competitions/seasons which are regarded as eligible for appearance stats are provided below, and if a player's data is not available for any of these competitions an appropriate note should be added to the table.

League appearances
League appearances and goals should include data for the following league spells, but should not include play-off matches:
 Midland League: 1934–35 to 1959–60 
 Football League: 1960-61 to present

Total appearances
The figures for total appearances and goals should include the League figures together with the following competitions:
 Play-off matches (1991–92, 1999-00, 2010–11)
 FA Cup
 Football League Cup; Football League Trophy (1983–84 to 1991–92, 1994–95 to 2008–09, 2010–11); Anglo-Italian Cup (1992–93, 1993–94)
 Football League Group Cup/Trophy (1981–82, 1982–83), Watney Cup (1970–71, 1972–73, 1973–74)

List of players

References 
Footnotes

Bibliography
 Player stats at Up the Posh, including breakdowns by season and match line-ups
 Post-war Football League Player statistics
 Soccerbase stats (use Search for...on left menu and select 'Players' drop down)

Players
 
Peterborough United
Association football player non-biographical articles